Jan Berger (born 1970 in Berlin) is a German screenwriter. He studied German studies and philosophy before he began to work as a screenwriter in 1997. In 2008 he received the Grimme-Preis for Offside.

Filmography
 Apokalypso – Bombenstimmung in Berlin (1999) (TV Movie) 
 Die Verwegene – Kämpfe um deinen Traum (2000) (TV Movie)
 Sumo Bruno (2000)
 Kebab Connection (2004)
 Boo, Zino & the Snurks (2004)
 Spielerfrauen (2005)
 FC Venus (2005)
 Offside (2005)
  (2006)
 Die Tür (2009)
 We Are the Night (2010)
 The Physician (2013)
  (2013)
 Winnetou – Eine neue Welt (2016)
 Winnetou – Das Geheimnis vom Silbersee (2016)
 Winnetou – Der letzte Kampf (2016)
 Robbi, Tobbi und das Fliewatüüt (2016)
 Subs (2018)

References

External links

1970 births
German screenwriters
German male screenwriters
Living people
Film people from Berlin